Ali Abdullahi Ibrahim  (1964) is a Nigerian politician from All Progressives Congress. He represents Ankpa/Omala/Olamaboro constituency in the House of Representatives of Nigeria, a post he was elected to in 2019. He is the Chairman, House Committee on Steel.

Political career 
Ibrahim was elected to the Nigerian National House of Representatives in the general election of 2019 to represent Ankpa/Omala/Olamaboro. During this time he is the Chairman, House Committee on Steel.

References 

All Progressives Congress politicians
1964 births
People from Kogi State
Members of the House of Representatives (Nigeria)
Living people